Port Costa is a small village and census-designated place (CDP) in Contra Costa County, California, located in East Bay region of the San Francisco Bay Area. Situated on the southern shore of the Carquinez Strait, the population was 190 at the 2010 census.

History 

Port Costa was founded in 1879 as a landing for the railroad ferry Solano, owned and operated by the Central Pacific Railroad. This put Port Costa on the main route of the transcontinental railroad. The Solano, later joined by the Contra Costa, carried entire trains across the Carquinez Strait from Benicia to Port Costa, from whence they continued on to the Oakland Pier. 

Businessman George W. McNear built the Port Costa Warehouses and Dock Company west of the new ferry terminal in 1880. The valley where Port Costa now sits, at one point called Bull Valley, was part of a ranch owned by William Piper. In 1883, McNear bought Piper's land for $100,000 and began to build up the town. Port Costa became the busiest port on the West Coast, primarily shipping wheat. 

Port Costa's first post office was established in 1881 with postmaster Kate Hurley. It later moved to a warehouse built by McNear, where it remains today. The Port Costa School, a classical revival building designed by architect William Wilde, was built in 1911, opened in 1912, and operated until 1966. In 1988, it was added to the National Register of Historic Places.

For the early decades of Port Costa's existence, much of the town's commercial activities took place on wharves and docks along the waterfront. These wharves and docks suffered from numerous fires between 1883-1941, and a large part of the "Waterfront Port Costa" area was demolished in 1921 after being badly damaged by shipworms. No docks or wharves are left standing today, although pilings remain. 

Besides the railroad and shipping, another important industry in Port Costa was brick making. Port Costa Brick Works operated from 1905 until 1991.

After California's wheat output dropped in the early 20th century and especially after the Southern Pacific (which took over the operations of the Central Pacific) constructed a railroad bridge at Martinez in 1930 to replace the ferry crossing, Port Costa lost population and importance.  

In 1963, Bill Rich purchased and renovated multiple Port Costa buildings, including the Burlington Hotel (built circa 1883) and McNear's warehouse (built 1886), with the goal of making the town a tourist attraction. Under this iteration, the warehouse housed multiple antique stores and, for two years, artist Clayton Bailey's Wonders of the World Museum. However, Port Costa fell into decline after a 1983 fire in the hills between Port Costa and Crockett.

In 1999, known biker bar the Warehouse Cafe, located in the warehouse originally built by McNear, was purchased by a new owner and gained a "cult following" over the decades. In 2012, the restaurant Bull Valley Roadhouse, which sits in McNear's old office building, was renovated. In the following year, the Burlington Hotel was renovated by new owners as well. Port Costa continues to be a destination for day or weekend trips.

Geography
Port Costa is surrounded by rolling hills grazed by cattle and managed by East Bay Regional Park District. Carquinez Strait Regional Shoreline stretches from Crockett through Port Costa and to Martinez. Big Bull Valley Creek runs along McEwen Road into a historic reservoir just above the town, then it runs in an underground pipe culvert beneath the town to the Carquinez Strait.

Demographics

The 2010 United States Census reported that Port Costa had a population of 190. The racial makeup of Port Costa was 172 (90.5%) White, 2 (1.1%) African American, 2 (1.1%) Native American, 7 (3.7%) Asian, and 7 (3.7%) from two or more races. Hispanic or Latino of any race were 10 persons (5.3%).

There were 99 households, out of which 15 (15.2%) had children under the age of 18 living in them, 37 (37.4%) were opposite-sex married couples living together, 4 (4.0%) had a female householder with no husband present, 5 (5.1%) had a male householder with no wife present.  There were 10 (10.1%) unmarried opposite-sex partnerships, and 3 (3.0%) same-sex married couples or partnerships. 42 households (42.4%) were made up of individuals, and 9 (9.1%) had someone living alone who was 65 years of age or older. The average household size was 1.92.  There were 46 families (46.5% of all households); the average family size was 2.61.

The population was spread out, with 19 people (10.0%) under the age of 18, 13 people (6.8%) aged 18 to 24, 38 people (20.0%) aged 25 to 44, 80 people (42.1%) aged 45 to 64, and 40 people (21.1%) who were 65 years of age or older.  The median age was 52.5 years. For every 100 females, there were 97.9 males.  For every 100 females age 18 and over, there were 101.2 males.

The homeowner vacancy rate was 5.4%; the rental vacancy rate was 2.1%.  118 people (62.1% of the population) lived in owner-occupied housing units and 72 people (37.9%) lived in rental housing units.

Notable people from Port Costa 

 Clayton Bailey and Betty Graveen Bailey

See also

References

External links

Census-designated places in Contra Costa County, California
Carquinez Strait
Populated places established in 1879
1879 establishments in California
Census-designated places in California